This is a list of compositions by John Corigliano sorted by genre, date of composition, title, and scoring.

External links
 John Corigliano webpage at G. Schirmer
 John Corigliano website: List of works

 
Corigliano, John, List of compositions by